Vitim (Bitiim) is an urban locality (an urban-type settlement) in Lensky District of the Sakha Republic, Russia, located  from Lensk, the administrative center of the district, on the left bank of the Lena River at its confluence with the Vitim River. As of the 2010 Census, its population was 4,376.

History
Vitim was first mentioned in 17th-century historical sources as a winter fort and later as a trading fort. By the mid-19th century, the settlement spread along a  section of the river, with a population of about 250 inhabitants, who made a living from river trade, fishing, hunting, gold mining, and handicrafts. During the Imperial era, it served as a place of political exile; H. Leivick was exiled here in 1912-1913.

Urban-type settlement status was granted to Vitim in 1958.

Administrative and municipal status
Within the framework of administrative divisions, the urban-type settlement of Vitim  is incorporated within Lensky District as the Settlement of Vitim. As a municipal division, the Settlement of Vitim is incorporated within Lensky Municipal District as Vitim Urban Settlement.

Economy
Vitim's development is being influenced by the development of the Talakan oil field.

Transportation
Vitim is served by the Vitim Airport.

Climate
Vitim has a subarctic climate (Köppen climate classification Dfc) with severely cold winters and warm summers. Precipitation is quite low but is somewhat higher in summer than at other times of the year.

References

Notes

Sources
Official website of the Sakha Republic. Registry of the Administrative-Territorial Divisions of the Sakha Republic. Lensky District. 

Urban-type settlements in the Sakha Republic
Irkutsk Governorate
Populated places on the Lena River